The 2014 FIFA World Cup qualification UEFA Group C was a UEFA qualifying group for the 2014 FIFA World Cup. The group comprised Germany, Sweden, Republic of Ireland, Austria, Faroe Islands and Kazakhstan.

The group winners, Germany, qualified directly for the 2014 FIFA World Cup. Sweden placed among the eight best runners-up and advanced to the play-offs, where they were drawn to play home-and-away matches against Portugal. However, they lost both matches and thus failed to qualify for the World Cup. Germany went on to win the tournament, defeating Argentina in the final.

Standings

Matches
The dates for fixtures were decided at a meeting held in Frankfurt, Germany, on 17–18 November 2011. The dates were not ratified by FIFA and a new schedule was announced on 5 December 2011 with new dates for the two matches between Austria and the Faroe Islands.

Goalscorers
There were 101 goals scored in 30 matches for an average of 3.37 goals per match.

8 goals

 Mesut Özil

6 goals

 David Alaba
 Robbie Keane
 Zlatan Ibrahimović

5 goals

 Marco Reus

4 goals

 Mario Götze
 Miroslav Klose
 Thomas Müller
 André Schürrle

3 goals

 Martin Harnik
 Marc Janko
 Toni Kroos
 Jonathan Walters
 Johan Elmander

2 goals

 Philipp Hosiner
 Andreas Ivanschitz
 Zlatko Junuzović
 Per Mertesacker
 Andrei Finonchenko
 Kairat Nurdauletov
 Rasmus Elm
 Tobias Hysén
 Alexander Kačaniklić

1 goal

 György Garics
 Sebastian Prödl
 Rógvi Baldvinsson
 Fróði Benjaminsen
 Arnbjørn Hansen
 Hallur Hansson
 İlkay Gündoğan
 Sami Khedira
 Heinrich Schmidtgal
 Dmitriy Shomko
 Kevin Doyle
 Andy Keogh
 Darren O'Dea
 John O'Shea
 Marc Wilson
 Marcus Berg
 Mikael Lustig
 Martin Olsson
 Anders Svensson

1 own goal

 Pól Jóhannus Justinussen (playing against the Republic of Ireland)
 Dmitriy Shomko (playing against the Republic of Ireland)

Discipline

Attendances

References

External links
Results and schedule for UEFA Group C (FIFA.com version)
Results and schedule for UEFA Group C (UEFA.com version)

C
2012 in Swedish football
2013 in Swedish football
2012 in Republic of Ireland association football
2013 in Republic of Ireland association football
2012–13 in German football
Qual
2012–13 in Austrian football
2013–14 in Austrian football
2012 in Kazakhstani football
2013 in Kazakhstani football
2012 in Faroe Islands football
2013 in Faroe Islands football